Garmabad (also Romanized as Garmābād; also known as Jarmābād and Jarmābaq) is a village in Rudbal Rural District, in the Central District of Marvdasht County, Fars Province, Iran. At the 2006 census, its population was 2,826, in 665 families.

References 

Populated places in Marvdasht County